Farm to Table is a 2021 Philippine television cooking show broadcast by GMA News TV and GTV. Hosted by JR Royol, it premiered on February 21, 2021 on GMA News TV's Sunday evening line up. In February 2021, GMA News TV was rebranded as GTV, with the show being carried over.

Premise
The show gives a glimpse of the food preparation, from growing and harvesting the fresh produce, to cooking and plating the dishes. It also aims to show how to grow your own food and promote the planting culture among the Filipinos.

References

External links
 

2021 Philippine television series debuts
Filipino-language television shows
GMA News TV original programming
GTV (Philippine TV network) original programming
Philippine television shows
Philippine cooking television series